Orkus Presents the best of 2000 is a German 2-CD compilation album released in 2000, through EFA records Germany and is the follow-up to Orkus Presents the best of 1999. The album is a mixture of Heavy Metal, Electronic and Rock music.

Track listing

Disc 1

 HIM - Poison Girl
 In Extremo - Vollmond
 Phillip Boa & The Voodooclub - Rome in the Rain
 Theatre of Tragedy -  Commute
 The Cassandra Complex - Twice as Good (Apoptygma Berzerk Remix)
 L'Ame Immortelle - Epitaph
 Die Form - Deep Inside
 Janus - Rorschach
 Atrocity - Wilder Schmetterling
 Covenant - One World One Sky
 Zeromancer - Clone Your Lover
 Love Like Blood - 7 Seconds
 Umbra et Imago - Mea Culpa
 Tanzwut - Bitte bitte (cover version)
 And One - Wasted
 Diary of Dreams - Butterfly: Dance!

Disc 2

 VNV Nation - Standing
 Suicide Commando - Comatose Delusion (Overdose Shot One)
 ASP - Schwarze Schmetterling
 Corvus Corax - Estuans Intrisecus
 Illuminate - Dunkellicht
 Sanguis Et Cinis - Secret and Sin
 Cinema Strange - Lindsay's Trachea
 The 69 Eyes - Gothic Girl
 Crematory - Act Seven
 Samsas Traum - Für Immer
 Fields of the Nephilim - One More Nightmare (Trees Come Down A.D.)
 Clan of Xymox - Number 1
 The Second Sight - Tomorrow
 In Strict Confidence - Kiss Your Shadow
 Terminal Choice - No Chance
 Hocico - Poltergeist

References

External links 
 
 

2000 compilation albums